The Kengwei Republic (Chinese: 坑尾公司, Hakka/Dutch: Hang-Moei; "End of the pit company") was an autonomous Chinese kongsi federation associated with Montrado (Chinese: 打勞鹿, Hakka: Montradok) district of West Kalimantan, Borneo but operates mainly in territories west of Montrado. It joined the Heshun Confederation in 1776 and was dissolved in 1839 at the hands of the Dagang kongsi.

History 

Records document that the members of the Kengwei kongsi came mainly from the localities of Guishan in Guizhou, a landlocked province in China. They were moderately powerful, having mines that operated in Pangkalan Batu (Chinese: 祭下港, Hakka: Pangkalan-Batoe), Luxiaheng (Chinese: 路下橫, Hakka: Loehawang), Kulor (Chinese: 骨律, Hakka: Koelor), and the Kengweishan (Chinese: 坑尾山, Hakka: Hang-moei-san), a hill named after the kongsi. At the time they joined the Heshun Confederation in 1776, the Kengwei also owned two privatized mines, the Jinhe 金和 and Guanghe 廣和 kongsis, two old Larah-based kongsis that can be traced back to Macao. Like many of the other Montrado-based kongsis, they had a strong affiliation to the Guizhou branch of the Dabogong cult. It is recorded that a Dabogong temple was present in Larah, then controlled by Kengwei. In 1777, Luo Fangbo, founder of the Lanfang Republic, passed through Kengwei kongsi's territory in Kengweishan to escape from rival organizations before recruiting troops to found the aforementioned republic in Mandor.

In 1807, during the first internal quarrels of the Heshun Confederation, Kengwei joined Dagang (the most powerful kongsi in Heshun)'s side in fighting the Jielian Republic over a water reservoir, even having convinced the Xinwu kongsi to come to Dagang's side. When Xin Bafen was eliminated in 1808 by Dagang, Kengwei took some of Xin Bafen's land, and later Shisanfen's land who dissolved shortly after. In 1814, when Liu Guibo of the Xinwu ascended as president of the Heshun, he attempted to integrate Xinwu with Kengwei to create a third powerful bloc in the Confederation (the others being Dagang and Santiaogou), a move met with so much outcry Guibo was forced to resign after ten days.

In 1818, when Dutch-appointed Magistrate G. Muller informed the Chinese kongsi they were now Dutch subjects, Kengwei's representative was present during the conference. During the 1823 treaty headed under J. H. Tobias in which the Chinese kongsi recognized the Dutch administration over them, Kengwei's seal was present as well.

Kengwei-Dagang Conflict (1837-1839) 
With the Dutch retreating from West Bornean affairs, Dagang and Kengwei's relationship deteoriated considerably. In 1836, Kengwei, along with its ally Xiawu, conspired to build a new mine and water reservoir around Kulor before the Dagang can, in the face of exhaustion of mining sites. Wen Guanshou (current president of Heshun from Dagang) found out about the plot, and told Kengwei that they had to destroy the mine and reservoir to avoid trouble. After Kengwei and Xiawu sent their delegations to Dagang to defend themselves, they were promptly arrested and a meeting date was decided later, and guards were sent to station at Pangkalan Batu. Tensions heightened when the Shiwufen kongsi house burned down, and Kengwei and Xiawu were accused. Guanshou attempted to mediate by releasing the prisoners, but forgot to recall the guards at Pangkalan Batu, who killed the delegation when they arrived.

This was the last straw for the two kongsis. A letter was sent to the Kengwei and Xiawu miners in Larah, telling they will flee to Lanfang in the middle of the night. The miners rallied around Kengwei's clerk, one Wu Jinlai, not knowing he was already in association with the Dagang. Here, he fled to join the Dagang kongsi, who marched to Xiawu and found the Kengwei had abandoned the kongsi. As Dagang celebrated their victory, Xiawu send a contingent of men to the Sambas sultan, requesting land be opened in Baluo so they can newly settle there, away from the pressure of Dagang. The sultan agreed, and a plot of land was opened up near Baluo (near present day Tayan), and in 1839, 700 men and women packed to take its leave. Dagang absorbed the former lands of the Kengwei and Xiawu, telling those who have remained that they were welcome as members of Dagang. With this, the Kengwei kongsi comes to an end.

References 

Kongsi federations
Chinese diaspora in Southeast Asia
Former countries in Southeast Asia
Former republics
Precolonial states of Indonesia
States and territories disestablished in 1853
States and territories established in 1776
18th-century establishments in Indonesia
Chinese-speaking countries and territories
History of Borneo